Neil McLeod or Neil Macleod may refer to:

Neil McLeod (politician) (1842–1915), Prince Edward Island lawyer, judge and politician
Neil McLeod (field hockey) (born 1952), New Zealand Olympic field hockey player
Neil McLeod (police officer) (c.1846–1890), New Zealand police constable killed in the line of duty
Neil MacLeod (footballer) (born 1960), former Australian rules footballer